Parrish is an unincorporated community in northwestern Manatee County, Florida, United States.

The community is located near the intersection of U.S. 301 and State Road 62 and is part of the North Port–Sarasota–Bradenton Metropolitan Statistical Area.

Climate

History
The first "settler" in the area would be William B. Hooker and William H. Johnson who established a plantation named Oak Hill in 1850 with an attempt being made to grow sea-island cotton but this effort failed. This plantation would burn down in the Seminole War but the area would continue to be referred to as Oak Hill. William Turner would make a homestead at Oak Hill in 1865 but only stayed for a few years before establishing Bradenton. He would sell the property to the Parish family in 1868.

The community was named for Crawford Parrish of Georgia along with his wife Mary Bratcher Vanzant. Shortly after he married her in 1841, Crawford moved south to Florida, on the banks of the Suwannee River, having slave labor on his plantation. In 1867, they sold their land and moved to present day Parrish which was, at the time referred to as Oak Hill. Crawford was a rancher and orange farmer. The Parish Post Office was established in 1879, effectively changing the spelling of the town’s name to Parish, until 1950 when the spelling was officially changed back to Parrish.

Compiled in the late 1930s and first published in 1939, the Florida guide listed Parrish's population as 721 and described it as "a citrus-fruit and vegetable shipping center".

Parrish would be a small agriculture community until the late 2000s with agricultural land being developed into subdivisions and the geographic boundaries changing as well.

See also
 Lake Parrish

References

External links

 The Sarasota Subdivision (Abandoned Rails.com)

Unincorporated communities in Manatee County, Florida
Sarasota metropolitan area
Unincorporated communities in Florida